Ziana Zain Unplugged is Ziana Zain's first live album released in 1996. All the tracks were sung during live performance. The album went platinum, selling more than 80,000 copies in Malaysia.

Album information
Ziana Zain Unplugged features thirteen live tracks from Ziana Zain's successful first unplugged concert show at Life Centre, Kuala Lumpur and one previously unreleased studio track: "Dekat Tapi Jauh" featuring Broery Marantika, which was fully composed by Johari Teh.

Ziana Zain Unplugged includes one song which wasn't available from Ziana's previous albums: "Gerhana". Two versions of this album were produced which were live version and studio version. The song "Gerhana" was included in both versions of the album.

Track listing
 "Sangkar Cinta" (Idzahar, Azam Dungun) — 4:54
 "Kekal" (Johari Teh) — 4:36
 "Ku Cinta Padamu"  (Zuriani, Nanee) — 5:15
 "Anggapanmu" (Asmin Mudin) — 4:57
 "Mimpimu Bukan Mimpiku" (Zuriani, Nanee) — 4:55
 "Kemelut Di Muara Kasih" (Saari Amri, Lukhman S.) — 7:02
 "Setia Ku Di Sini" (Salman, Nurbisa II) — 5:08
 "Di Sini Selamanya" (Zuriani, Nanee) — 4:14
 "Tiada Kepastian" (Johari Teh) — 4:29
 "Korban Cinta" (Johari Teh) — 5:21
 "Madah Berhelah" (Saari Amri) — 5:28
 "Dekat Tapi Jauh" (featuring Broery Marantika) (Johari Teh) — 4:01
 "Gerhana" (Johari Teh) — 4:18

Awards

Certification

Personnel
 Producer – Johari Teh
 Executive producer – Mohamad Firhad
 Executive A&R – Asni Abdul Samad
 Director of marketing & promotion- Rosmin Hashim
 Manager of marketing & promotion – Samirah Hambali
 Manager of RCA Domestic – Rohani Ismail
 Music director – Ramli M.S
 Music composition – Ramli M.S, Jimmy Ali, Mokhzani Ismail & Rosli Iman
 Guest artist – Broery Marantika
 Management of promotion – Lisa Aryanti Tahir, Farida Hassan, Rouslan Mokhtar, Asri Ismail, Rozana Abu Hassan & Eddie Hamid
 Live recording – King's Studio
 Engineer of live recording – Peter Pilley
 Mixing – Peter Chong
 Artwork – Andy & Dester (BMG Creative Dept.)
 Sponsor – Salem Cool Planet, TV3, Hotel Equatorial
 Stage/Set Concept – Bombay (KUL City)
 Set Decoration – RSM Creative
 Lightning Design – KUL City
 Lightning Director – Bombay
 Lightning Operator – Bombay, Treasure (Cahaya Audio)

References

External links
 Fan Site

1996 live albums
Malay-language live albums
Bertelsmann Music Group live albums
Ziana Zain live albums